Balti Wine is a wine brand marketed as complementary with South Asian food, especially curries such as Balti. Launched in 2004, the wine is made in three white and two red varieties with a "chilli rating" index to help consumers select the right wine for their food, depending on the spiciness of the dish. The wine is made with grapes from Argentina. By the end of 2006, Balti wines was found in 70% of the Indian restaurants in Rusholme's Curry Mile and Sharif had secured distribution contracts in the United States and with Gulf Air and P&O Cruises.

History
The wine brand was created by Manchester-based British Pakistani entrepreneur Ashraf Sharif, in collaboration with Manchester University's Food Technology department. Noticing the market gap in providing ethnic wines to match with spicy South Asian foods, Sharif launched Balti wine in 2004 and began marketing them to Indian restaurants.

See also
 Balti Triangle

References

External links
 Balti Wine's website

Wine companies
Pakistani cuisine in the United Kingdom
Food and drink introduced in 2004
Desi cuisine
Drink companies of England